Edward Charles Malesic (born August 14, 1960) is an American prelate of the Catholic Church who has been serving as bishop of the Diocese of Cleveland in Ohio since 2020. He previously served as bishop of the Diocese of Greensburg in Pennsylvania from 2015 to 2020.

Biography

Early life 
Edward  Malesic was born August 14, 1960, in Harrisburg, Pennsylvania, one of four children born to Joseph A. and Elizabeth Schatt Malesic. He graduated from Central Dauphin East High School in Harrisburg in 1978. 

Malesic majored in biology for three years at Lebanon Valley College.  He entered the Pontifical College Josephinum in Columbus, Ohio, where he earned a Bachelor of Divinity degree in 1983 and Master of Divinity degree in 1987.

Priesthood 
Malesic was ordained a priest by Bishop William Keeler for the Diocese of Harrisburg on May 30, 1987. Malesic later received a Licentiate of Canon Law from the Catholic University of America in Washington, D.C.

After his ordination, Malesic's pastoral assignments included assistant pastor at St. Theresa Parish in New Cumberland, Pennsylvania, from 1987 to 1989, and St. Rose of Lima Parish in York, Pennsylvania, from 1989 to 1992. He concurrently served as the campus minister at York College of Pennsylvania in Spring Garden Township and served in the same capacity at Millersville University of Pennsylvania in Millersville from 1992 to 1996. Malesic was associated with the Newman Center at Messiah College in Mechanicsburg, Pennsylvania, from 2000 to 2004.

Malesic was the administrator and then pastor at Holy Infant Parish in York Haven, Pennsylvania from 2004 to 2015. With his studies in canon law, he served in various roles in the diocesan tribunal. They include auditor, adjutant judicial vicar, and secretary for canonical services. He served as judicial vicar and secretary of canonical services from 2006 to 2015.

Bishop of Greensburg 
Pope Francis named Malesic as bishop of the Diocese of Greensburg on April 24, 2015. He was consecrated in the Cathedral of the Blessed Sacrament in Greensburg on July 13, 2015, by Archbishop Charles J. Chaput, with Bishop Lawrence Brandt and Bishop Ronald Gainer as co-consecrators.

On June 22, 2020, a man filed a lawsuit against Malesic, the Diocese of Greensburg, and Cardinal Donald Wuerl.  The plaintiff claimed that Joseph L. Sredzinski, a priest in Fayette County, Pennsylvania who died in 2015, sexually abused him beginning in 1991, from age 11 to 17. Reports of the lawsuit did not explain Malesic's involvement.

Bishop of Cleveland 
Pope Francis appointed Malesic as bishop of the Diocese of Cleveland on July 16, 2020. He was installed on September 14, 2020.

See also

 Catholic Church hierarchy
 Catholic Church in the United States
 Historical list of the Catholic bishops of the United States
 List of Catholic bishops of the United States
 Lists of patriarchs, archbishops, and bishops

References

External links
Diocese of Cleveland Official Site  
Diocese of Greensburg Official Site

  

1960 births
Living people
People from Harrisburg, Pennsylvania
Pontifical College Josephinum alumni
Catholic University of America alumni
21st-century Roman Catholic bishops in the United States
Roman Catholic bishops of Greensburg
Bishops appointed by Pope Francis